is a Japanese light novel series written by Makoto Sanda (Rental Magica) and illustrated by Mineji Sakamoto. Officially part of the Fate series, it began serialization by Type-Moon under the Type-Moon Books imprint on December 30, 2014 to May 17, 2019. The novels are set between the events of Fate/Zero and Fate/stay night, focusing on Lord El-Melloi II, a former master who now investigates several mysteries after his participation in the Fourth Holy Grail War. A sequel novel series, began publishing on December 25, 2020.

Two media adaptations were officially made: a manga adaptation by Makoto Sanda with illustrations from Tō Azuma began serialization in Kadokawa Shoten's Young Ace magazine on October 4, 2017 and an anime adaptation by Troyca, which adapts the Rail Zeppelin chapter, aired from July 6 to September 28, 2019. Special edition episodes of the anime adaptation aired on December 31, 2018 and December 31, 2021.

Story
Taking place 10 years after the events of Fourth Holy Grail War and 2 months before the events of Fate/stay night, the story focuses on Lord El-Melloi II, formerly known as Waver Velvet, a successor of Kayneth and former master in the last Grail War, who is now a professor under the ranks of the Mage's Association. In his years as a professor in the Clock Tower, he is acting as the temporary head of the El-Melloi household until a proper successor can take over. When strange mysteries involving magic start occurring throughout London, he teams up with his apprentice, Gray, to solve these magical cases and expose the hidden conspiracies that drive the Mage's Association.

Characters

Main characters

Played by: Yuya Matsushita
The protagonist of the series. He was first introduced as a side character and participant in the Fourth Holy Grail War of Fate/Zero as the Master of Rider, Iskandar. After the events of Fate/Zero, he returned to the Clock Tower to resume his study of magecraft. The previous Lord El-Melloi had been killed during the events of Fate/Zero which resulted in a sharp decline of the El-Melloi clan. Waver assumes the title of Lord El-Melloi II after agreeing to assist the true heir, Reines El-Melloi Archisorte, in restoring the clan until she is old enough to take charge.

Played by: Saho Aono
An apprentice of Lord El-Melloi II, she is a girl who lived in the countryside of Britain before moving to the city. Originally a normal villager, she is revealed to have been altered since birth as a vessel for the second coming of Artoria Pendragon, the Saber-class servant of the Fourth Holy Grail War to wield the Holy Spear Rhongomyniad. Born as a result of her village's attempts, her wielding the spear results in her appearance to slowly starting to transform into that of Artoria's. After El-Melloi II realizes who she is, he requests that Gray keeps her face hidden under her hood. In Fate/Grand Order, she was identified as an Assassin-class Demi-servant, similar to Mash Kyrielight.

 

Gray's Mystic Code, a form of the Holy Spear Rhongomyniad taking the form a cube-like entity to preserve the spear's mystery. Extremely talkative and can transform into a scythe for Gray to wield as a weapon. His personality is implied to be based on Sir Kay, Artoria's brother.

Played by: Kaho Amasaki
Kayneth El-Melloi Archibald's niece and the bloodline successor of the El-Melloi Household. As a result of her age and inexperience she requests that Waver Velvet, Lord El-Melloi II, lead the household until she is ready. She treats him as though he is her older brother. She is equipped with a powerful Mystic Eyes ability and was always seen with Trimmau, her Mystic Code which also serves as her maid.

Played by: Takeru Naya
One of the students of Lord El-Melloi II in the Modern Magecraft class. He is both smart yet also dimwitted. He first appeared as one of the main protagonist of Fate/strange fake as the master of False Berserker.

Played by: Ryūjirō Izaki
One of the Lord El-Melloi II's prominent students in the Modern Magecraft class. He is nicknamed "le chien" (the dog in French) by Flat due to his Beast Magecraft skills which gives him wolf-like sense of smell and speed.

Also a student of Lord El-Melloi II and the oldest heir of the Forvedge family. He enrolled to the Mages' Association when his sister Fiore stepped down as the heir of the family. He first appeared in an alternate timeline as one of the protagonists in Fate/Apocrypha as the master of Berserker of Black under the Yggdmillennia clan.

 An old friend of Lord El-Melloi II and a member of the Mages' Association from the Creation Department, who is responsible for Waver's participation in the Fourth Holy Grail War in Fuyuki, Japan. He is also a legendary Tuner for Magic Crests and carries a violin to tune them. He is the only one who calls Waver by his original name and not by his title.

 Played by: Kazuho Sō
 An officer from the Policies Department of the Clock Tower debuting from the Adra Castle Separation arc.

 The main antagonist debuting from the Rail Zeppelin arc. He was the previous head of the Modern Magecraft Theory Department and was responsible for the murders of mages who had their heads stolen along with their Mystic Eyes seven years prior to the start of the series. He is named "Heartless" due to his heart being stolen by fairies. After he summoned Hephaestion, he ranked her as a Faker-class Servant, which he created.

El-Melloi classroom

 A student from the El-Melloi Classroom debuting from the Rail Zeppelin arc and involved in the Mystic Eyes Collection Train incident. Her family specializes in gems to create Mystic Eyes. She also wishes to become Lord El-Melloi II's mistress, much to his chagrin.

Servants
 – 

A Mysterious servant belonging to Doctor Heartless. Although summoned as Hephaestion, she is actually its twin sister; "Iskandar's Shadow". She was summoned by Heartless using the stolen piece of Iskandar's cape and harbors deep hatred to Waver concerning his relation to his previous servant.

Media

Novel
The Case Files of Lord El-Melloi II was written by Makoto Sanda, considered to be his first work after being approached by Type-Moon. During a session of tabletop RPG game Red Dragon, alongside Nasu and Gen Urobuchi, Nasu asked Makoto if he could actually write a story for the Fate series. It was then on TYPE-MOON FEST in July 2012 that Nasu asked Makoto to write a story for Waver Velvet/Lord El-Melloi II, on which he agreed. The first novel was first published by Type-Moon under their Type-Moon Books label on Comiket 87 on December 30, 2014. The tenth and last was published on May 17, 2019. It was illustrated by Mineji Sakamoto. Kadokawa Shoten later released the novels in a paperback edition.

A sequel novel series titled  was announced in December 2019. The first volume was released on December 25, 2020.

Manga
A manga adaptation by Makoto Sanda with illustrations from Tō Azuma began serialization in Kadokawa Shoten's Young Ace magazine on October 4, 2017. As of March 2023, ten volumes have been released.

Anime
An anime adaptation of the novels, which only adapts the Rail Zeppelin storyline under the title  was announced at the Fate Project New Year's TV special on December 31, 2018, which also aired a special episode of the series. The series is animated by Troyca. Makoto Katō directs the series with Ukyō Kodachi as its writer, while Yuki Kajiura composes the music for the series. Jun Nakai is the character designer, while Ei Aoki is credited as supervisor. It aired from July 6 to September 28, 2019 on Tokyo MX, BS11, GTV, GYT, and MBS. Kajiura composed the series' opening theme song "starting the case: Rail Zeppelin", while ASCA performs the series' ending theme song , with lyrics written by Kajiura. Aniplex of America and Crunchyroll streamed the series in North America, Central America, South America, the United Kingdom, Ireland, Australia, and New Zealand. AnimeLab streamed the series in Australia and New Zealand. Funimation also simulcasted the series in their streaming site in North America. On October 3, 2020, which is Waver's birthday, Aniplex of America announced they will be releasing the series in a Blu-ray box set with a full English dub. The set was released on December 15, 2020.

During Aniplex Online Fest 2021, it was announced that the series will receive a special edition episode. It aired on December 31, 2021. ASCA performed the theme song .

Video games
Characters of the novel series also appeared in Delightworks's mobile role playing game Fate/Grand Order as special servants based on the characters. Waver Velvet/Lord El-Melloi II is a main five-star Caster-class Servant under the name of Zhuge Liang and has appeared in the Fate/Accel Zero Order event as a main character and guide. Gray, Reines (under the name of Sima Yi) and Luvia (under the name of Astraea) all were added as servants in the Lady Reines' Case Files collaboration event. Both Gray and Luvia are four-star Assassin and Ruler class Servants respectively, however Reines is a five-star just like her adoptive older brother, in the Rider class.

Stage play
A stage play adaptation based on the novel's "Adra Castle Separation" chapter, began on December 14, 2019 and concluded on January 19, 2020. Voice Actors Daisuke Ono, Akio Ōtsuka and Takumi Yamazaki, who voice Add, Rider (Iskandar) and Kayneth El-Melloi Archibald respectively, reprised their roles for the play. Limited release of the musical was released on blu-ray July 8, 2020.

Notes

References

External links
 Official novels website 
 Official manga website 
 Official anime website 
 Official anime website 
 Official stage play website 
 

2014 Japanese novels
2019 anime television series debuts
2017 manga
Anime and manga based on light novels
Anime composed by Yuki Kajiura
Aniplex
Fate/stay night anime
Fate/stay night manga
Fate/stay night novels
Kadokawa Shoten manga
Light novels
Mystery anime and manga
Seinen manga
Tokyo MX original programming
Troyca
Type-Moon